Jude Winchester (born 13 April 1993) is a Northern Irish semi-professional footballer who plays as a midfielder for Crusaders.

Career
After playing youth football with Linfield alongside his twin brother Carl, Winchester signed for Scottish club Kilmarnock in August 2011. He signed a four-year contract in November 2011, and made his senior professional debut on 28 August 2011, appearing as a substitute in a 4–3 victory against Inverness Caledonian Thistle. He went on to score his first goal for Kilmarnock against Dunfermline Athletic on 12 May 2012.

On 30 January 2014, Winchester signed for Cliftonville on loan until the end of the 2013–14 season.

On 4 June 2014, Winchester signed permanently with Cliftonville, on a two-year contract.

On 13 January 2022, Winchester signed for Crusaders. On 21 January, Winchester was sent off on his Crusaders debut, for a foul on Glentoran player Joe Crowe.

Career statistics

References

External links

Northern Ireland profile at NIFG

1993 births
Living people
Association footballers from Belfast
Association footballers from Northern Ireland
Association football midfielders
Kilmarnock F.C. players
Linfield F.C. players
Cliftonville F.C. players
Crusaders F.C. players
Ballymena United F.C. players
NIFL Premiership players
Scottish Premier League players
Scottish Professional Football League players
Northern Ireland under-21 international footballers